The following is a list of Detroit Tigers broadcasters, past and present:

Radio

Current

The current flagship radio station for the Tigers is WXYT-FM, at 97.1 FM.  Dan Dickerson calls play-by-play while former Tigers catcher Jim Price serves as the color analyst during home games; both double as pre-game and post-game show hosts. Bobby Scales serves as the primary analyst for road games as of the 2023 season. The games are available online as well via Audacy. If a scheduling conflict occurs, WWJ is a substitute for its sister station.

Former flagships
WJR was the Tigers' radio flagship from 1964 to 2000. Other former Tigers flagships include WXYT (currently known as "The Bet Detroit") and WKMH (currently known as WDTW).

Former radio announcers
Ty Tyson (1927–1942, 1951)
Harry Heilmann (1934–1950)
Paul Williams (1951)
Van Patrick (1952–1959)
Dizzy Trout (1953–1955)
Mel Ott (1956–1958)
George Kell (1959–1963)
Ernie Harwell (1960–1991, 1993, 1999–2002)
Bob Scheffing (1964)
Gene Osborn (1965–1966)
Ray Lane (1967–1972)
Paul Carey (1973–1991)
Rick Rizzs (1992–1994)
Bob Rathbun (1992–1994)
Frank Beckmann (1995–1998)
Lary Sorensen (1995–June 1998)
Al Kaline (2009, substitute analyst for select road games)
John Keating (2009, substitute analyst for select road games)
Dan Petry (2012, 2019, 2021–2022, substitute analyst for select games)
Ken Kal (2013, 2016, 2018, substitute play-by-play for select games)
Andy Dirks (2019, substitute analyst for two home games) 
Dan Hasty (2021, substitute play-by-play for one road game)
Austin Jackson (2021–2022, substitute analyst for select road games)
Craig Monroe (2021–2022, substitute analyst for select road games)
Alex Avila (2022, substitute analyst for select road games)
Doug Fister (2022, substitute analyst for road doubleheader)
Greg Gania (2022, substitute play-by-play for road doubleheader)

Broadcasters by year

2020s

2010s

2000s

1990s

1980s

1970s

1960s

1950s

Television

Current

The television rights are currently held by Bally Sports Detroit (formerly Fox Sports Detroit). Matt Shepard serves as the play-by-play announcer, while Kirk Gibson and Jack Morris serve as color commentators. Morris was 'indefinitely suspended' by Bally Sports Detroit on August 19, 2021, after speaking in what Bally called an 'offensive accent' while Los Angeles Angels pitcher/designated hitter Shohei Ohtani was at bat.

Pre-game and post-game show hosts and reporters include John Keating, Mickey York, Trevor Thompson, Justin White, and Johnny Kane, while Craig Monroe and Dan Petry provide studio analysis.

Former TV outlets

The Tigers have spent most of their broadcast televised history across two of Detroit's heritage "Big Three" network stations, WJBK (Channel 2, Fox; formerly with CBS from 1948 to 1994) and WDIV (Channel 4, NBC; originally WWJ-TV from 1947 to 1978), as well as two of the market's former legacy independent stations, WMYD (Channel 20, formerly WXON-TV and WDWB) and WKBD (Channel 50).  Channel 4 was the original Tiger television outlet, carrying games from 1947 to 1952, and again for a twenty-season run from 1975 to 1994.  Channel 4, at least during a time when NBC's ratings were sagging during the late 1970s to the mid-1980s, was one of a handful of the network's affiliates that was either a primary outlet or an affiliate of the local/regional baseball team.

Significant in the Tiger broadcasting network were television stations owned by Tigers' owner John Fetzer, including WKZO-TV (now WWMT) in Kalamazoo, WLNS in Lansing, WJRT in Flint, WWTV and WWUP-TV in northern Michigan, and even some television stations in Nebraska, namely KOLN-TV in Lincoln and its satellite in Grand Island, Nebraska.

WJBK took over the Tigers telecasts starting with the 1953 season, and carried games until the end of the 1974 season; since 2007, the station simulcasts the team's home opener each season from Fox Sports Detroit.  WKBD, for many years known as Detroit's leading independent TV station, as well as the longtime over-the-air TV home of the Red Wings and Pistons, televised Tigers games starting in 1995 (when it was an UPN owned-and-operated station) until 2003.  WMYD televised selected Tigers games only for the 2006 season, and as WXON-TV and the local affiliate of the ONTV subscription TV service, Channel 20 also showed the team's games from 1981 to 1983.

Pro-Am Sports System (PASS), originally started in 1982, became the regional cable outlet for the Tigers starting in 1984, after the network 
was purchased by then-Tigers team owner Tom Monaghan.  Monaghan sold PASS to Post-Newsweek Stations (now Graham Media Group) in 1992, after he sold the Tigers to local pizza magnate and Red Wings owner Mike Ilitch.  PASS, thereafter, re-located its operations to the WDIV studio/office facility in Downtown Detroit.  PASS shut down operations in 1997, after the Red Wings, Tigers, and Pistons all elected to sign-with and helped launch Fox Sports Detroit.

Former TV announcers
Ty Tyson (1947–1952)
Harry Heilmann (1947–1950)
Van Patrick (1953–1959)
Dizzy Trout (1953–1955)
Mel Ott (1956–1958)
George Kell (1959–1963, 1965–1996)
Ernie Harwell (1960–1964, 1994–1998)
Bob Scheffing (1964)
Ray Lane (1965–1966, 1999–2003)
Larry Osterman (1967–1977, 1984–1992)
Don Kremer (1975–1976)
Al Kaline (1976–2001)
Joe Pellegrino (1977–1978)
 Mike Barry (1978–1979)
Larry Adderley (1981–1983)
Hank Aguirre (1981–1983)
Norm Cash (1981–1983)
Bill Freehan (1984–1985)
Jim Northrup (1985–1994)
Jim Price (1993–1997)
Fred McLeod (1995–1997)
Josh Lewin (1998–2001)
Frank Beckmann (1999–2003)
Tom Paciorek (2000)
Lance Parrish (2002)
Mario Impemba (2002–2018)
Rod Allen (2003–2018)
Jack Morris (2015–2016, 2019–2022)

Broadcasters by year

2020s

2010s

2000s

1990s

1980s

1970s

1960s

1950s

References

External links

Detroit Tigers history: all-time broadcasters

Detroit Tigers
 
Broadcasters
Fox Sports Networks
Bally Sports
CBS Radio Sports